The Eurovision Song Contest 1999 was the 44th edition of the Eurovision Song Contest, held on 29 May 1999 at the International Convention Centre in Jerusalem, Israel. The event was presented by singer Dafna Dekel, radio and television presenter Yigal Ravid and model and television presenter Sigal Shachmon.

Twenty-three countries participated in the contest.

It was the first contest since  that countries were allowed to perform in the language of their choice, and not necessary the language of their country. It was also the first ever contest to not feature an orchestra or live music accompanying the competing entries.

Location 

It was the second time that Israel had staged the contest, following the  also held in Jerusalem.

The prospect of Israel staging the contest resulted in protest by members of the Orthodox Jewish community in the country, including opposition by the deputy mayor of Jerusalem Haim Miller to the contest being staged in the city. Additional concerns over funding for the event also contributed to speculation that the contest could be moved to Malta or the United Kingdom, the nations which had finished in the top three alongside Israel the previous year. Financial guarantees by the Israeli government however helped to ensure that the contest would take place in Israel. The possibility of holding the event in an open air venue was discussed, however concerns over security led to the choice of an indoor venue for the event. A tight security presence was felt during the rehearsal week as a precaution against potential disruption from Palestinian militant groups.

Production 

The Eurovision Song Contest 1999 was produced by the Israeli public broadcaster Israel Broadcasting Authority (IBA). Usually able to hold a maximum of 3,000 people, modifications made to the Ussishkin Auditorium reduced the capacity to around 2,000 for the contest, with rows of seats removed from the floor to make room for the stage and from the balcony to allow for the construction of boxes for use by various commentators.

Rehearsals in the venue for the competing acts began on 24 May 1999. Each country had two technical rehearsals in the week approaching the contest: the first rehearsals took place on 24 and 25 May, with each country allowed 40 minutes total on stage followed by a 20 minute press conference; the second rehearsals subsequently took place on 26 and 27 May, with each country allocated  30 minutes on stage. Each country took to the stage in the order in which they would perform, but due to budget concerns the Lithuanian delegation was permitted to arrive in Israel one day later than the other delegations. Subsequently the first day's rehearsals began with Belgium as the second country to perform in the contest, with Lithuania being the last country to complete their first rehearsal on the second day; for the second rehearsals the order was corrected and Lithuania was scheduled first on stage. Additional rehearsals took place on 26 May for the contest's concluding performance with all artists, and on 27 May for the contest's presenters and to test the voting scoreboard's computer graphics. Two dress rehearsals held on 28 May were held with an audience, the second of which was also recorded as a production stand-by in case of problems during the live contest. A further dress rehearsal took place on the afternoon of 29 May ahead of the live contest, followed by security and technical checks.

Singer Dafna Dekel, radio and television presenter Yigal Ravid and model and television presenter Sigal Shachmon were the presenters of the 1999 contest, the first time that three presenters had been involved in a single edition. The writers of the winning song were awarded with a trophy designed by Yaacov Agam, which was presented by the previous year's winning artist Dana International.

The show began with a computer animation entitled "From Birmingham to Jerusalem", highlighting the contest's journey from last year's host country the United Kingdom to Israel and containing notable landmarks and features of the competing countries; the animation then transitioned into recorded footage of Jerusalem including dancers and hosts Dekel and Shachmon. A pause between entries was included for the first time to allow broadcasters to provide advertisements during the show; placed between the Polish and Icelandic entries, entertainment was provided during the break for the benefit of the audience in the arena and for non-commercial broadcasters featuring co-presenters Dekel and Shachmon and a performance of the song "To Life" from the musical Fiddler on the Roof. The contest's pre-recorded interval act entitled "Freedom Calls", shown following the final competing entry and during the voting window, was staged outside the Walls of Jerusalem and the Tower of David and featured performances by a troupe of dancers, a chorus and Dana International singing the D'ror Yikra and a cover of "Free", originally recorded by Stevie Wonder. Following the traditional reprise performance of the winning song, the show finished with a performance of the English version of Israel's 1979 contest winning song "Hallelujah" involving all the competing artists as a tribute to the victims of the then-ongoing Kosovo War and to the people of the Balkans who were unable to watch the contest following the bombing of television services in the Federal Republic of Yugoslavia.

A compilation album featuring many of the competing entries was released in Israel following the contest, commissioned by IBA and released through the Israeli record label IMP Records. The release contained nineteen of the twenty-three competing acts on CD and an additional video CD with clips from the televised broadcast and footage from backstage. The entries from Cyprus, the Netherlands, Poland and the United Kingdom were absent due to the record label failing to secure the necessary rights for these songs.

Format

Entries 
Each participating broadcaster was represented in the contest by one song, no longer than three minutes in duration. A maximum of six performers were allowed on stage during each country's performance, and all performers were required to be at least 16 years old in the year of the contest. Selected entries were not permitted to be released commercially before 1 January 1999, and were then only allowed to be released in the country they represented until after the contest was held. Entries were required to be selected by each country's participating broadcaster by 15 March, and the final submission date for all selected entries to be received by the contest organisers was set for 29 March. This submission was required to include a sound recording of the entry and backing track for use during the contest, a video presentation of the song on stage being performed by the artists, and the text of the song lyrics in its original language and translations in French and English for distribution to the participating broadcasters, their commentators and juries.

For the first time since the  the participants had full freedom to perform in any language, and not simply that of the country they represented. This led to a marked increase in the number of entries which were performed in English. Additionally the rules were modified to make the orchestra a non-obligatory feature of the contest of which organising broadcasters were free to opt out. IBA chose not to provide an orchestra, with all entries subsequently being performed with backing tracks; as a result for the first time in the contest's history no live music was featured. No orchestra has been included as part of the competition since, and in subsequent years the rules were modified again to entirely remove the option for entries to be accompanied by live music.

Following the confirmation of the twenty-three competing countries the draw to determine the running order was held on 17 November 1998.

Voting procedure 

The results of the 1999 contest were determined using the scoring system introduced in : each country awarded twelve points to its favourite entry, followed by ten points to its second favourite, and then awarded points in decreasing value from eight to one for the remaining songs which featured in the country's top ten, with countries unable to vote for their own entry. Each participating country was required to use televoting to determine their points. Viewers had a total of five minutes to register their vote by calling one of twenty-two different telephone numbers to represent the twenty-three competing entries except that which represented their own country, with voting lines opening following the performance of the last competing entry. Once phone lines were opened a video recap containing short clips of each competing entry with the accompanying phone number for voting was shown in order to aid viewers during the voting window. Systems were also put in place to prevent lobby groups from one country voting for their song by travelling to other countries.

Countries which were unable to hold a televote due to technological limitations were granted an exception, and their points were determined by an assembled jury of eight individuals, which was required to be split evenly between members of the public and music professionals, comprised additionally of an equal number of men and women, and below and above 30 years of age. Countries using televoting were also required to appoint a back-up jury of the same composition which would be called into action upon technical failure preventing the televote results from being used. Each jury member voted in secret and awarded between one and ten votes to each participating song, excluding that from their own country and with no abstentions permitted. The votes of each member were collected following the country's performance and then tallied by the non-voting jury chairperson to determine the points to be awarded. In any cases where two or more songs in the top ten received the same number of votes, a show of hands by all jury members was used to determine the final placing; if a tie still remained, the youngest jury member would have the deciding vote.

Postcards 
Each entry was preceded by a video postcard which served as an introduction to the competing artists from each country, as well as providing an opportunity to showcase the running artistic theme of the event and creating a transition between entries to allow stage crew to make changes on stage. The postcards for the 1999 contest featured animations of paintings of biblical stories which transitioned into footage of modern locations in Israel or clips representing specific themes related to modern Israeli culture and industries. The various locations and themes for each postcard are listed below by order of performance:

 Jacob's Ladder; Israel Museum, Jerusalem
 Pharaoh and his Army; Eilat
 Noah's Ark; landscapes of Galilee
 Ruth; Israeli agriculture
 Jonah and the Whale; Jaffa
 Adam and Eve; Israeli fashion
 The Sea of Galilee; Tiberias and surroundings
 Workers of the Tabernacle; Israeli tech and virtual reality
 Joseph and His Brothers; Haifa
 The Golden Calf; Israeli jewellery industry
 The Prophet; Tel Aviv nightlife
 David and Goliath; Israeli sports
 The Manna from Heaven; Israeli culinary
 The Basket of Moses; rafting on the Jordan River
 David and Bathsheba; music and art on the roofs of Tel Aviv
 Daniel and the Lions; Acre
 Cain and Abel; Judaean Desert
 The Judgement of Solomon; Jerusalem
 The Promised Land; Jezreel Valley
 David and Michal; Suzanne Dellal Centre for Dance and Theatre, Tel Aviv
 The Tower of Babel; Israeli beaches
 Samson; Caesarea National Park
 The Zodiac mosaic at the Old Beth Alfa Synagogue; love at the Dead Sea

Participating countries

Qualification 
Any relegated countries would be able to return the following year, thus allowing all countries the opportunity to compete in at least one in every two editions. The relegation rules introduced for the 1997 contest were again utilised ahead of the 1999 contest, based on each country's average points total in previous contests. The twenty-three participants were made up of the previous year's winning country and host nation, the seventeen countries which had obtained the highest average points total over the preceding five contests, and any eligible countries which had not competed in the 1998 contest. In cases where the average was identical between two or more countries the total number of points scored in the most recent contest determined the final order.

This new "Big Four" group of countries was created to ensure the financial viability of the event and was prompted by a number of poor results in previous years for some of these countries, which if repeated in 1999 could have resulted in those countries being eliminated.

Finland, Greece, Hungary, Macedonia, Romania, Slovakia and Switzerland were therefore excluded from participating in the 1999 contest, to make way for the return of Austria, Bosnia and Herzegovina, Denmark, Iceland and Lithuania, and new debuting country . However Latvia's Latvijas Televīzija subsequently withdrew its participation at a late stage, and their place in the contest was subsequently offered to Hungary as the excluded country with the highest average points total. Hungarian broadcaster Magyar Televízió declined and the offer was then passed to Portugal's Rádio e Televisão de Portugal as the next country in line, which accepted.

The calculations used to determine the countries relegated for the 1999 contest are outlined in the table below.

Table key

Returning artists
Several of the artists taking part in the contest had previously performed as lead artists in past editions.

Participants and results 

The contest took place on 29 May 1999 at 22:00 (IST) and lasted 3 hours and 13 minutes. The table below outlines the participating countries, the order in which they performed, the competing artists and songs, and the results of the voting.

Iceland, Croatia and Bosnia and Herzegovina also achieved their best results to date, placing second, fourth and seventh respectively.

During the presentation of the trophy to the contest winners Dana International caused a security alert in the auditorium; while lifting the trophy and feigning difficulty due to its weight the singer lost her balance and fell to the stage along with the winning songwriters before being helped up by security agents.

The Norwegian delegation raised an objection to the use of simulated male vocals during the performance of Croatian entry "Marija Magdalena". Following the contest this was found to have contravened the contest rules regarding the use of vocals on the backing tracks, and Croatia were sanctioned by the EBU with the loss of 33% of their points for the purpose of calculating their average points total for qualification in following contests. The country's position and points at this contest however remain unchanged.

Detailed voting results 

Televoting was used to determine the points awarded by all countries, except Lithuania, Turkey, Ireland and Bosnia and Herzegovina. Ireland had intended to use televoting, however technical failures at Telecom Éireann ahead of the voting window meant that the majority of calls were not registered and the country's back-up jury was utilised to determine its points.

The announcement of the results from each country was conducted in the order in which they performed, with the spokespersons announcing their country's points in English or French in ascending order. The detailed breakdown of the points awarded by each country is listed in the tables below.

12 points 
The below table summarises how the maximum 12 points were awarded from one country to another. The winning country is shown in bold.

Spokespersons 

Each country nominated a spokesperson who was responsible for announcing, in English or French, the votes for their respective country. Spokespersons at the 1999 contest are listed below.

 Andrius Tapinas
 
 Hugo de Campos
 Marko Rašica
 Colin Berry
 Mira Berginc
 Osman Erkan
 Ragnhild Sælthun Fjørtoft
 Kirsten Siggaard
 Marie Myriam
 Edsilia Rombley
 Jan Chojnacki
 Áslaug Dóra Eyjólfsdóttir
 Marina Maleni
 Pontus Gårdinger
 Manuel Luís Goucha
 Clare McNamara
 
 
 Nirvana Azzopardi
 Renan Demirkan
 Segmedina Srna
 Mart Sander

Broadcasts 

Each participating broadcaster was required to relay live and in full the contest via television. Non-participating EBU member broadcasters were also able to relay the contest as "passive participants"; any passive countries wishing to participate in the following year's event were also required to provide a live broadcast of the contest or a deferred broadcast within 24 hours. Broadcasters were able to send commentators to provide coverage of the contest in their own native language and to relay information about the artists and songs to their viewers. Known details on the broadcasts in each country, including the specific broadcasting stations and commentators, are shown in the tables below.

Other awards

Barbara Dex Award
The Barbara Dex Award, created in 1997 by fansite House of Eurovision, was awarded to the performer deemed to have been the "worst dressed" among the participants. The winner in 1999 was Spain's representative Lydia, as determined by visitors to the House of Eurovision website. This was the first edition of the award to be determined by site visitors, as the winners in 1997 and 1998 had been chosen by the founders of the House of Eurovision site Edwin van Thillo and Rob Paardekam.

Notes and references

Notes

References

Bibliography

External links

 

 
1999
1999 in music
May 1999 events in Asia
May 1999 events in Europe
1999 in Europe
1999 in Israel
1990s in Jerusalem
1999 in Israeli television
Events in Jerusalem
Festivals in Jerusalem
Music in Jerusalem
Music festivals in Israel